UGPS J072227.51−054031.2 (designation often abbreviated to UGPS 0722−05) is a brown dwarf of late T type, or possibly a rogue planet located approximately  from Earth.

History of observations

Discovery
The astronomical object was discovered by Philip Lucas at the University of Hertfordshire and announced in 2010. The discovery image was taken on 28 November 2006 by the UKIRT Infrared Deep Sky Survey (UKIDSS) with a recovery image confirming the object's proper motion on 2 March 2010. The reported distance is derived from the current measured parallax of 246 milliarcseconds. The object was initially reported to be at an even closer distance of 2.9 parsecs, which would have placed it among the ten nearest stars to the Sun but later measurements revealed that the object was in fact located at a greater distance than initially thought, at 4.1 parsecs.

Space motion
UGPS 0722−05 has proper motion of about 970 milliarcseconds per year.

Radial velocity of UGPS 0722-05, measured by Bochanski et al. and published in 2011, is 46.9 ± 2.5 km/s.

Properties
The object is roughly the volume of Jupiter, but is estimated to have 5–40 Jupiter masses. This would make it less massive than ε Indi Ba. Planets have a mass of less than about 13 Jupiter masses. Infrared spectra shows the object contains water vapor and methane and has a surface temperature of approximately 480–560 kelvins.

Notes

References

External links
Article on UGPS 0722-05 at SolStation.com

Local Bubble
Monoceros (constellation)
Brown dwarfs
UGPS objects
T-type stars
Rogue planets